Sortilegio (literally "Sortilege", "Love Spell" in English-speaking markets) is a Mexican telenovela produced by Carla Estrada, in her final telenovela for Televisa in 2009. and stars Jacqueline Bracamontes and William Levy as main protagonists, while David Zepeda, Chantal Andere, Otto Sirgo, Azela Robinson, Julián Gil and Ana Brenda Contreras are playing main villains/antagonists of the story.

From October 6, 2009 to February 17, 2010, Univisión broadcast Sortilegio weeknights at 9pm/8c replacing Mañana es para siempre. The last episode was broadcast on February 17, 2010 with Corazón salvaje replacing it on February 22, 2010. From July 30 to September 7, 2012, Univision broadcast 2 hour reruns of Sortilegio weekdays at 1pm/12c, replacing Corazón Apasionado. From September 10 to October 19, 2012, reruns of Sortilegio were broadcast at 2pm/1c. The last episode was broadcast on October 19, 2012 with Cuidado con el ángel replacing it on October 22, 2012. This telenovela is a remake of Tú o nadie.

As of November 24, 2014 for the first time Galavisión. is debuting Sortilegio at 11am/10c, replacing one hour of Amor Real.

As of December 7, 2015 - April 15, 2016 TL Novelas broadcast 11:00, 17:00 and 23:00 replacing Alma de hierro, with Fuego en la sangre  replacing it the April 18.

As of March 21, 2016 for the first time UniMás. is debuting Sortilegio at 1pm/12c, 2 hour of special.

Plot
Victoria had an affair with her husband Samuel's friend, Antonio Lombardo, resulting in the birth of twins, Bruno and Raquel. Antonio also had a son, Alejandro, with his wife Adriana. After their respective spouses died, they reunited and got married. However, they didn't tell their children that they are half-siblings, as that would reveal their infidelities. Instead they raised their children to recognize each other as step-siblings.

Years pass, and Bruno comes to be an irresponsible man who does not respect laws. Alejandro, on the other hand, is very responsible. Antonio prefers Alejandro over Bruno and decides that Alejandro should inherit his money when he passes away. Antonio and Victoria have a meeting at Bruno's high school about Bruno's behavior and are told that he is expelled. While leaving the school, Antonio is run over and killed.  Bruno upon learning that Antonio left everything to Alejandro comes up with a plan to pretend to be Alejandro and marry Maria Jose, a sweet innocent girl and then kill Alejandro. Making Maria Jose a very rich widow. When news comes of Alejandro's death Maria Jose and her sister Paula travel to Merida for the funeral. Maria Jose is heart broken to learn that Alejandro has died. However, she also learns that the man she feel in love with is named Bruno and not Alejandro. Maria Jose is furious to learn that Bruno tricked her and wants nothing to do with his evil plan. Bruno then threatens to send her father to prison if she doesn't pretend to be Alejandro's widow. Maria  Jose is trapped and reluctantly accepts to deceive everyone into believing that she did get married with Alejandro. Just as Bruno thinks he has gotten away with his plan, Alejandro returns alive and shocked to learn that his family thinks that he married Maria Jose. Alejandro must then discover the truth about his supposed marriage to Maria Jose, who he is slowly falling in love with. Thus begins a story of intrigue, sibling hatred and rivalry, two sons in love with and fighting for the love of the same women, corporate espionage, and twin sisters torn apart by circumstance.

Cast

Starring 
 Jacqueline Bracamontes as María José Samaniego de Lombardo / Sandra Betancourt
 William Levy as Alejandro Lombardo
 Daniela Romo as Victoria de Lombardo
 Gabriel Soto as Fernando Alanís 
 Chantal Andere as Raquel Albéniz
 Ana Brenda Contreras as Maura Albarrán
 David Zepeda as Bruno Albéniz

Also starring 

 Mónica Miguel as Maya San Juan
 Otto Sirgo as Jorge Kruguer
 Aarón Hernán as Porfirio Betancourt
 Patricio Castillo as Emiliano Alanís
 Azela Robinson as Elena Miranda de Kruguer
 Luis Couturier as Hernán Plascencia
 Héctor Sáez as Pedro Samaniego
 Marcelo Córdoba as Roberto Castelar
 Julián Gil as Ulises Villaseñor
 Daniela Luján as Lisette Albarrán
 Guillermo Zarur as Ezequiel Flores
 Adalberto Parra as Erick Díaz
 Wendy González as Paula Samaniego
 Manuela Ímaz as Katia Alanís
 Rosita Pelayo as Meche Brito
 Arturo Lorca as Arturo 
 Carlos Giron as Gabriel Brito
 Iliana de la Garza as Julia Fernández
 Rolando Fernández as Gregorio Diez
 Dolores Oliva as Piedad
 Christina Pastor as Mary
 José Carlos Ruiz as Chucho Gavira
 María Victoria as Felipa García

Recurring 
 Fernando Allende as Antonio Lombardo
 Felicia Mercado as Adriana Villavicencio de Lombardo
 Mauricio Aspe as Fabián Lombardo
 Alejandro Durán as Aníbal
 Elizabeth Álvarez as Irene
 Pablo Valentín as Delegado
 Alejandro Tomasi as Samuel Albeniz

References

External links
 

2009 telenovelas
2009 Mexican television series debuts
2009 Mexican television series endings
Mexican telenovelas
Televisa telenovelas
Spanish-language telenovelas
Mexican LGBT-related television shows